Peringamala may refer to:

 Peringammala, a village in Thiruvananthapuram district in the state of north side of Kerala, India. It is 3 km from Venganoor
 Peringamala, a village in Thiruvananthapuram district in the state of Kerala, India.  It is the second largest panchayath in Kerala.